Bishnu Sethi (born as Bishnu Charan Sethi; 5 June 1961 – 19 September 2022) was an Indian politician who was the deputy leader of the opposition in the Odisha Legislative Assembly. He was the MLA from Dhamnagar Assembly Constituency.

A leader of Bharatiya Janata Party, Sethi held the position of Vice President in Bharatiya Janata Party Odisha Unit. He was the MLA from Chandabali Assembly Constituency from 2000 to 2004 and then for Dhamnagar from 2019 till his death in 2022. He was also a poet and writer in Odia literature.

In July 2022 he was hospitalised for Covid-19 and subsequently died from the virus.

Early life and education 
Sethi was born on 5 June 1961 in a remote village of Tihidi in the district of Bhadrak (Odisha). From the very beginning of his childhood, he lost his mother and was brought up by his father Gayadhar Sethi. He completed his schooling from Tihidi High School. He has been connected with Rashtriya Swayamsevak Sangh and Akhil Bharatiya Vidyarthi Parishad from his early political life.

After graduating from Utkal University in History and Library Science, he moved to Jawaharlal Nehru University, Delhi. He qualified for Odisha Administrative Service conducted by Odisha Public Service Commission two times. He was the founder secretary of M.A. English Medium School, Tihidi, Bhadrak.

Early political career 
Being influenced by the ideology of Shyama Prasad Mukharjee and Deendayal Upadhyaya, Sethi's first political exposure was: a member of Bharatiya Janata Yuva Morcha. During the rise of Bharatiya Janata Party in India by the leadership of Atal Bihari Vajpayee and L. K. Adwani, Sethi stood in Bhadrak parliamentary constituency  at the age of 30 from BJP. Then he was appointed secretary of Bharatiya Janata Yuva Morcha of Odisha state. With his leadership, Bharatiya Janata Party was propelled to a greater political prominence in Bhadrak. He took the charge of district president of his party three times.

Political career 
In the year of 1995, he was a member of Bharatiya Janata Party's National council. Then he worked as Odisha state vice president of BJP scheduled Caste Morcha.

In 2000 Sethi was elected to Odisha Legislative Assembly from Chandabali Legislative constituency as a member. During his first time membership, he could participate in the discussion in Karnataka State Assembly Estimate Committee on behalf of Odisha. In 2004 Sethi again appeared as an MLA candidate from BJP and BJD united alliance; but he lost the battle by a mere margin of votes in same.

In the year of 2006 he was selected as the chairman of Odisha State Cashew Development Corporation. Being the chairperson of the Corporation he threw his attempts to boost cashew plantation program in Odisha abruptly and laid the paper before Goa Convention regarding this.

In 2009 and 2014 Sethi again fought as the BJP candidate from Dhamanagar assembly constituency but he could not win the elections. Regardless of the defeats, by virtue of his oratorical and organizational skills, he became the face of the Bharatiya Janata Party in eastern part of Odisha. In 2016 he has been appointed state vice president of Odisha BJP.

He was elected as a member of estimate committee of Odisha Legislative Assembly.

He was Deputy Leader of BJP Legislature Party in Odisha Assembly.

Political ideology 
Sethi believed in "Ekatma Manav Vaad", the doctrine of integral humanism, which is also the official doctrine of his party. He had a strong belief in the ideology of BJP and Prime Minister Narendra Modi and was confident about BJP fulfilling all its commitments towards nation made during general election. He believed under PM Modi's leadership India would soon emerge as superpower of the world. Sethi also put faith in the working style and strong political will power of Dharmendra Pradhan for the development of Eastern India as well as Odisha.

Literature works 

Sethi was the sub-editor of Odia weekly Bisesh Khabar. He was the editor of Ghasaphula, a historical and cultural quarterly magazine. His prose collection 'Sironama Sirodharya' reflects many socio-cultural issues and their solutions. He wrote two poem collections named Nirmaya Aakash Tale and Niswa Matira Swara. Moreover, he had keen interest in short stories and Odia history, culture, heritage and language also. He was the regular columnist of various Odia newspapers and journals. He has been elected as the Senate Member to Utkal University of Culture, Bhubaneswar.

For last years he was the pioneer to organize the Literary assembly of college and school level students. He was the editorial member of 'Utkal Sammilani'.

He was the regular member of Indian National Trust for Art and Cultural Heritage which makes commitment on Indian architectural heritage and cultural-historical symphony.

During his first time membership of Odisha Legislative Assembly, he drew the attention of Odisha to declare Bande Utkal Janani as State Anthem, the creation of Late Kantakabi Lakshmikanta Mahapatra, which is not achieved officially.

References 

1961 births
2022 deaths
People from Bhadrak district
Bharatiya Janata Party politicians from Odisha
Odisha MLAs 2019–2024
21st-century Indian politicians
Deaths from the COVID-19 pandemic in India